Hamid Mojtahedi (Persian: حمید مجتهدی) was an Iranian director and cinematographer who is best known for his documentaries.

Life and career
Mojtahedi graduated in cinematography and photography from University of London and after that, specialization on camera and lighting from UCLA.

He has been the cinematographer and producer of some feature films in Iran, USA and Canada.

Mojtahedi is well known for creating the Iran Documentary TV series that shows IRAN in new and pretty shots.
 
He also was the friend of Moustapha Akkad and has cooperation with him in filming The Messenger and Lion of the Desert.

Filmography

Cinematographer
 Beyond the 7th Door (1978)
 Bar faraz-e asemanha (1980)
 Mah-e asal (1976)
 Se nafar rooy-e khat (1976)
 Kandu  (1975)
 Zabih (1975)
 Kafar (1972)
 Sange sabour (1968)
 Darvazehe Taghdir (1965)

Director
 Darvazehe Taghdir (1965)
 Iran Documentary (2001-20??)

Thanks
 Mehman-e-Maman (2004)

References
 
 Hamid Mojtahedi: My camera bows to IRAN (in Persian) in ISNA.
 About 11 years making Iran Documentary (in Persian) in ISNA.

1942 births
2021 deaths
Iranian film directors
Iranian cinematographers